Josephine Wright Chapman (1867–1943) was a pioneering woman architect, one of fewer than 100 practicing nationally in the first half of the 20th century. She was also the first woman architect "in the history of American architecture to start and head her very own firm," which she accomplished at the tail end of the 19th century. Practicing both in Boston and New York, she got her start as an apprentice in the prestigious Blackall, Clapp and Whittemore firm. Her first practice opened in 1897 in Grundmann Studios, a Boston-based women's art collective. A member of the New York Society of Architects, and one of only 70 female architects in the United States at the time, she was refused admission by both the American Institute of Architects and the Boston Architectural Club on the basis of her gender. Nonetheless, her repertoire soon included "churches, clubs, libraries, and apartments, as well as the Women’s Clubs in Lynn and Worcester, Massachusetts." Chapman's second practice was founded in New York, and that's when her career really took off,"[a]s confirmed by The Ladies’ Home Journal, which noted her popularity: “You can find her [Chapman’s] work everywhere in the environs of New York…” 

Four of Chapman's buildings are now in the National Register of Historic Places: Boston's steel-framed Winthrop Building, Harvard's Craigie Arms (since renamed for Chapman), Worcester's Tuckerman Hall and Washington D.C.'s Hillandale, built for the heiress to Standard Oil in 1923.

Career 
Chapman's architectural education began in 1892 when Clarence Blackall agreed to let her apprentice under him. Blackall taught her about public building design and how to experiment with new materials. In 1893, the firm designed the first steel-frame building, the Winthrop Building in Boston. 

Chapman would go on to set up her own firm in Boston, in Grundmann Studios, a women's art collective, in 1897. "The commission that made her reputation would be the New England Building and she began design work on it as soon as the announcement of the contest for the building appeared in the papers." That set the stage for all of her future success. Chapman was commissioned by Harvard University to design their Craigie Arms dormitory. While working on that project she also designed St. Mark's Episcopal in Leominster, Massachusetts. By the start of the 20th century, Chapman had six drafters, including one woman, at her firm.

After 1901, she applied to join the American Institute of Architects and the Boston Architectural Club. Both refused to admit her. In 1907 she was accepted by the New York Society of Architects, after relocating to New York City. There, she opened a firm at Washington Square Park, focusing on residential design. Around 1909 she "reign[ed] supreme as the only woman architect in the Hub."

Gallery 
(Selection was limited by availability.)

Designs
 Craigie Hall / Craigie Arms, Harvard University, Cambridge, Massachusetts (1897)
 All Saints Episcopal church, Attleboro, Mass. (c. 1900)
 Episcopal church, Leominster, Mass. (c. 1900)
 New England Building, Pan-American Exposition, Buffalo, New York, 1901
 Worcester Woman's Club / Tuckerman Hall, Worcester, Mass. (1902)
 New Century Building, Huntington Ave., Boston (c. 1903)
 Hillandale, Georgetown, Washington DC (1922)
 Houses, Douglas Manor, Queens, NY (c. 1916)

Personal 
Chapman was described as "modest, direct, simple," with "ability, energy, and indomitable faith in herself." (Ladies Home Journal, October 1914). Raised in Fitchburg, Massachusetts, Chapman was one of four daughters to Mary E. Wright and James Levi Chapman, the president of the Fitchburg Machine Works.

See also
Women in architecture

References

Further reading
 Chapman. How to Decorate Your Home. Success. June 1904.
 Chapman. Pretty Wall Coverings. Success. May 1905.
 Chapman. Home Furnishings and Decorations. Success, June 1905.
 Chapman. Letter to the editor. New York Times, September 8, 1914.
 Sarah Allaback. The First American Women Architects. University of Illinois Press, 2008.

External links

 WorldCat. Chapman, Josephine Wright
 Google news archive. Articles about Chapman
 Flickr. Tuckerman Hall, Worcester, 2008
 Flickr. Tuckerman Hall, Worcester
 Pan-American Exposition of 1901, Buffalo NY.

1867 births
1943 deaths
People from Fitchburg, Massachusetts
19th-century American architects
20th-century architecture in the United States
American women architects
Architecture award winners
Architects from Boston
Architects from New York City
20th-century American architects